The 2010–11 European Badminton Circuit season started in May 2010 and ended in May 2011.

Results

Winners

Performance by countries
Tabulated below are the Circuit performances based on countries. Only countries who have won a title are listed:

References 

European Badminton Circuit
European Badminton Circuit
European Badminton Circuit seasons